People's Democratic Alliance is a political party in Manipur, India. The President and Leader of the party is Bd. Behring Anal. It is recognised as State Party in Manipur by the Election Commission of India.

See also 
 Political Parties in Manipur

References

External links

2006 establishments in Manipur
Political parties established in 2006
Political parties in Manipur